Webster Barnaby (born December 9, 1959) is a British-American politician who has served as the Florida State Representative for the 27th district since 2020. He is a member of the Republican Party.

Early life and education 
Barnaby was born in Birmingham, England. He earned an associate degree in business from Birmingham Metropolitan College.

Career 
After working in the hospitality industry in the United States Virgin Islands, Barnaby moved to Deltona, Florida in 1991. From 1994 to 2010, Barnaby worked as a district manager for National Write Your Congressman. He later served on the Deltona City Council from 2012 to 2020. A pastor, he has said opening prayers for several Donald Trump rallies. Barnaby was elected to the Florida House of Representatives in November 2020.

Personal life 
Barnaby became a naturalized American citizen in 1998. He and his wife, Silvia, have two children.

References

External links

Living people
1959 births
People from Birmingham, West Midlands
Republican Party members of the Florida House of Representatives
African-American state legislators in Florida
English emigrants to the United States
Florida city council members
21st-century American politicians
Naturalized citizens of the United States
21st-century African-American politicians
20th-century African-American people